DAV Public School, Kusmunda is located in Kusmunda Area of Korba, Chhattisgarh, India. Founded in 1983 by South Eastern Coalfields Limited and D.A.V. College Managing Committee. It is affiliated to the Central Board of Secondary Education of New Delhi and is governed by South Eastern Coalfields Limited.

See also
Education in India
Literacy in India  
DAV Public School, Gevra
Beacon English School

References

Schools affiliated with the Arya Samaj
Central Board of Secondary Education
High schools and secondary schools in Chhattisgarh
Private schools in Chhattisgarh
Korba district
Educational institutions established in 1983
1983 establishments in Madhya Pradesh